The Randwick City Hall is a heritage-listed town hall located in the Sydney suburb of , New South Wales, Australia. Designed by Messrs Blackmann and Parkes in the Victorian Italianate architectural style, the town hall was completed in 1882 at a cost of A£2,300 to serve as the town hall and municipal chamber for the Borough of Randwick.

The City Hall is listed on the (now defunct) Register of the National Estate and as an item of local government significance on the New South Wales Heritage Database.

See also

 List of town halls in Sydney
 Architecture of Sydney

References

External links

Government buildings completed in 1882
Town halls in Sydney
Italianate architecture in Sydney
1882 establishments in Australia